Cressy is a small town   south-west of Launceston, Tasmania. It came into existence in the 1850s to service the surrounding wheat farms.  At the 2006 census, Cressy had a population of 670.  It is known as Tasmania's "Trout capital" for the good fishing in the area.
It is also home to an extensive agriculture research facility for the Tasmanian Institute of Agricultural Research.

Cressy Post Office opened on 17 September 1856.

Nearby towns include:
Bishopsbourne,
Bracknell,
Liffey, 
Blackwood Creek,
Poatina and 
Longford.

History
Cressy was established as the main centre for the Cressy Company. The Cressy Company's first director Captain Bartholemew Boyle Thomas chose to name company after the Battle of Crecy in the 14th Century, at which one of his ancestors fought.  The Cressy Company also known as the "Cressy Establishment", was a large agricultural company which owned a significant portion of the Norfolk Plains.  The first building in Cressy was The Cressy Hotel built in 1845 by William Brumby.  Cressy became an official township in 1848. Much of the land in the area was owned by the O'Connor family, founded by Irish migrant Roderic O'Connor.

An Anglican theological college, St Wilfrid's, was located in Cressy from 1904 to 1929. 

Brumby's Creek, the Weirs, the Macquarie Lake and the Liffey rivers serve as a popular trout fishing spot.  The annual Tasmanian Trout Expo is hosted in Cressy.

References

Towns in Tasmania
Localities of Northern Midlands Council